Kristrún Sigurjónsdóttir (born 14 March 1985) is an Icelandic former basketball player and a former member of the Icelandic national basketball team. During her career, she won the Icelandic championship three times as a member of Haukar.

Playing career
Kristrún's first senior games where for the joint team of ÍR/Breiðablik in the second-tier league. After helping ÍR win the league and gain promotion in 2003, she debuted in the top-tier league during the 2003–2004 season where she averaged 10.5 points in 18 games. After ÍR's relegation that season, she transferred to Haukar where she won back-to-back national championships in 2006 and 2007. She was one of the league's best players during the 2008–2009 season, averaging a career high 19.4 points during the regular season. Despite battling a groin injury for all the playoffs, she helped Haukar beat KR in the playoff finals for the national championship.

After the season, she signed with Hamar. During her first season with Hamar, she averaged 17.5 points per game and helped the team to the national championship finals for the first time.

Kristrún played for Valur from 2011 to 2015 when she signed with Skallagrímur. She helped Skallagrímur win the 1. deild in 2016 and return to the Úrvalsdeild for the first time since 1976. She returned to Valur in September 2017 and played one season before retiring in 2018.

After two seasons away, Kristrún made a comeback with ÍR in 2020. In her first game back, she had 16 points and 8 rebounds in a victory against Njarðvík.

Icelandic national team
From 2005 to 2014, Kristrún played 34 games for the Icelandic national basketball team.

Awards, titles and accomplishments

Individual awards
Úrvalsdeild Domestic All-First Team (4): 2008, 2009, 2010, 2013
Division I Domestic All-First Team : 2016

Titles
Icelandic champion (3): 2006, 2007, 2009
Icelandic Basketball Cup : 2007
Icelandic Supercup : 2006
Icelandic Company Cup (3): 2005, 2006, 2013
Icelandic Division I (2): 2003, 2016

References

External links
Icelandic statistics 2008-present

1985 births
Living people
Kristrun Sigurjonsdottir
Forwards (basketball)
Kristrun Sigurjonsdottir
Kristrun Sigurjonsdottir
Kristrun Sigurjonsdottir
Kristrun Sigurjonsdottir
Kristrun Sigurjonsdottir
Kristrun Sigurjonsdottir